Pike Township is a township in Lyon County, Kansas, United States.

History
Pike Township was originally called Cottonwood Township, and the latter name was established in 1857. It was renamed Pike Township in 1860.

References

Townships in Lyon County, Kansas
Townships in Kansas
1857 establishments in Kansas Territory